The Church of Our Lady Queen of Peace is a parish church in the Roman Catholic Archdiocese of New York, located at 90 Third Street in the New Dorp neighborhood of Staten Island, New York City. It was established on October 10, 1922, and the present church building was inaugurated on Christmas Eve, 1928.

References

External links 
 Official website of OLQP Church
 Official website of OLQP School

Christian organizations established in 1922
Roman Catholic churches in Staten Island